Na'ama Cohen (or Naama/Neama, ; born 7 October 1988) is an Israeli football defender, currently playing for F.C. Kiryat Gat. She is a member of the Israeli national team, having played her debut for the national team against Belarus.

Honours
 Ligat Nashim (2):
(with Maccabi Holon)  2007–08, 2008–09
 Ligat Nashim Shniya (1):
(with Ironi Bat Yam)  2006–07
Cup (4):
(with Maccabi Holon)  2007–08, 2008–09, 2009–10, 2012–13

References

External links
 
 

1988 births
Living people
Israeli Jews
Israeli women's footballers
Israel women's international footballers
Maccabi Holon F.C. (women) players
Ironi Bat Yam F.C. (women) players
F.C. Kiryat Gat (women) players
Women's association football defenders
Footballers from Rishon LeZion